Yenicami Agdelen SK is a Turkish Cypriot football club based in North Nicosia.

Yenicami Agdelen S.K (YAK) was founded in 1951. Its colours are black and white. It plays its matches in the Nicosia Atatürk Stadium. Its nickname is "Kartal" ("Eagle").

Honors
Süper Lig (previously Birinci Lig): (8)
 1970–71, 1972–73, 1973–74, 1975–76, 1983–84, 2013–14, 2014–15, 2016–17

Kıbrıs Kupası and Federasyon Kupası: (8)
 1962, 1973, 1974, 1989, 2003, 2013, 2015, 2020

References

Football clubs in Nicosia
Football clubs in Northern Cyprus
1951 establishments in Cyprus